World No. 1 Caroline Wozniacki was the defending champion and successfully defended the title beating Lucie Šafářová in the final, 6–1, 6–4.

Seeds

Qualifying

Main draw

Finals

Top half

Bottom half

References
Main Draw

Danish Open (tennis)
e-Boks Sony Ericsson Open - Singles